Down There... is the single demo released by the members of Beherit under the name The Lord Diabolus. It was released independently in 1991.

Track listing
 "Intro (Tireheb)" – 0:44
 "Six Days with Sadistic Slayer" – 2:51
 "Nocturnal Evil" – 3:04
 "Fallen Souls" – 5:21

External links
 The Lord Diabolus at Last.fm
 Information and reviews at Encyclopaedia Metallum

1991 EPs
Beherit albums